William "Bill" Benjamin Lava (March 18, 1911 – February 20, 1971) was a composer and arranger who composed and conducted music for feature films as well as that for the Warner Bros.' Looney Tunes and Merrie Melodies animated cartoons from 1962 to 1969, replacing the deceased Milt Franklyn, making him the last composer and arranger in the classic era of Warner Bros. Cartoons.

Lava's music was markedly different from that of Franklyn and previous composer Carl Stalling, with a tendency towards atonality. A sense of tension is often created in Lava's scores using sequences based on the notes of the diminished seventh chord.

Lava also composed and sang the theme to the TV western series Cheyenne  and composed the original theme from Gunsmoke.

Career
Lava was educated at Von Humboldt Grammar School and Lane Tech High School in Chicago, then attended Northwestern University where his major was journalism. He studied conducting with Albert Coates in Los Angeles. Lava also wrote short stories for various magazines and was the editor of Northwestern Commerce Magazine and associate editor of Purple Parrot..

Arriving in Hollywood in 1936, Lava arranged for musical radio programs, then scored a number of serials such as Zorro's Fighting Legion and motion pictures, such as The Painted Stallion; A Boy and His Dog; Embraceable You; Dangerously They Live; The Hidden Hand; I Won't Play; Star in the Night and Hitler Lives. He was also responsible for scores for the Warner Bros.' Joe McDoakes short subjects and Republic serials. Among his compositions during this era were The Moonrise Song (It Just Dawned On Me).

During World War II Lava composed music for various United States Department of War documentary films.

Walt Disney Productions hired Lava in the mid-1950s, where he wrote or co-wrote the incidental music for Zorro and the Spin and Marty and Hardy Boys segments of The Mickey Mouse Club. While he was later best known for cartoon music, Lava did not score any cartoons at  Disney, though he is credited with the score for 1955's TV segment The Story of the Silly Symphony.

On his arrival at the Warner Bros.' cartoon studio, Lava's first assignment was the Tweety cartoon The Jet Cage. Franklyn had scored the first two minutes of the cartoon when he died suddenly of a heart attack; though Lava completed the cartoon, Franklyn was credited with the entire score. Franklyn used strings and flutes in his portion, arranged similarly to his earlier cartoons, while Lava's score sounds more mechanical and less orchestrated, with a xylophone at one point. Lava's first credited cartoon is Good Noose, also released in 1962. Although Lava's previous work also sounded mechanical, it was greatly enhanced by the studio orchestra.  However, at the time of his arrival, Warner Bros. reduced, and later dismantled, the full-time studio orchestra. Without the music budget that he was accustomed to, Lava was forced to work with a much smaller orchestra to record his scores.

Television
Lava was responsible for many scores, including those heard in eleven Road Runner/Wile E. Coyote cartoons, released from 1965–1966 subcontracted by DePatie-Freleng Enterprises to Format Films. The budgets for these cartoons, all directed by Rudy Larriva and known as the "Larriva Eleven", were even tighter still, so much so that only the first short, Run, Run, Sweet Road Runner had real scored music.  The other ten (from Tired and Feathered to Clippety Clobbered) used a set of generic musical cues, which did not follow the action closely as scores did in other Warner Brothers productions. However, he did manage to produce proper scores for two out of the three Road Runner/Wile E. shorts produced fully by DePatie-Freleng, Rushing Roulette and The Wild Chase (also featuring Speedy Gonzales and Sylvester).

Overall, as mentioned above, Lava’s first short at Warner Bros. was the 1962 Tweety and Sylvester short The Jet Cage. The first short for which he provided a complete score was the Daffy Duck short Good Noose, also released in 1962. Good Noose was also the first short for which he was credited; unlike the remaining shorts produced at the original Warner Bros. Cartoons studio, where he was credited as "Bill Lava", he was here credited as "William Lava", which would not happen again until he was once again credited as "William Lava" from 1967 to 1969, for the three shorts produced by Format Productions (only serving as supervisor on Quacker Tracker) and for the entirety of the shorts produced at Warner Bros.-Seven Arts.

Lava also composed music for 19 of the 124 Pink Panther cartoons (USA, 1964, animation), always based on Henry Mancini's original theme, adapting it to closely follow character action. Walter Greene scored the nineteenth cartoon, Pink, Plunk, Plink, however Lava scored the following one, Smile Pretty, Say Pink. Greene scored all the following shorts (excluding Extinct Pink, composed by Doug Goodwin, who was known for his music for other DePatie-Freleng shorts series such as The Ant and the Aardvark and Roland and Rattfink) until Therapeutic Pink. Following this, the remaining shorts would be aired on television as part of The All New Pink Panther Show (although they would be rereleased theatrically), where all shorts utilized music cues composed by Steve DePatie (son of series co-producer David H. DePatie). Starting with Congratulations It's Pink and ending with Therapeutic Pink, both Greene's and Lava's music were utilized in the cartoons.  He earned the 1964 Academy Award for Best Cartoon Short, The Pink Phink and he co-authored the music for the movie  PT-109 . He also composed music for  The Battle of Britain  and the documentary  Hitler Lives .

Lava co-wrote the theme (with Irving Taylor) and most of the incidental music for the TV series F Troop. Lava also composed the silent-film music for the "bookend" sequences at the beginning and end of the 1961 Twilight Zone episode "Once Upon a Time".

Lava was also employed as Music Supervisor with David Rose in a couple of seasons of Bonanza.

Although Lava's feature film work was not as prolific, he composed the scores to movies such as Wall of Noise (1963), Chamber of Horrors (1966), Chubasco (1968), In Enemy Country (1968), Assignment to Kill (1968), The Good Guys and the Bad Guys (1969) and Dracula vs. Frankenstein (1971).

Personal life
William Lava was the son of Abraham Lava (1882–1958) and Rose Chernavsky (1886–1938). He married Lenore Goldman on December 31, 1932 in Chicago, Illinois. They had two daughters, Charmaine (1938–2012) and Rochelle Lava (1939–1997).

A staunch anti-communist, Lava became known as an outspoken critic of the Cuban Revolution. He spoke in favor of direct military action against the Castro regime, continuing to protest in this manner from 1959 until his death.

References

External links
 
 The William Lava papers at the American Heritage Center

1911 births
1971 deaths
20th-century American composers
20th-century classical musicians
American film score composers
Medill School of Journalism alumni
Musicians from Saint Paul, Minnesota
Warner Bros. Cartoons music composers